Gintautas is a Lithuanian masculine given name. Notable people with the name include:

Gintautas Iešmantas (1930–2016), Lithuanian politician
Gintautas Šulija (b. 1978), Lithuanian Attorney at law
Gintautas Umaras (b. 1963), Lithuanian track and road racing cyclist 

Lithuanian masculine given names